Ancy-Dornot is a commune in the Moselle department of northeastern France. The municipality was established on 1 January 2016 and consists of the former communes of Ancy-sur-Moselle and Dornot.

See also 
 Communes of the Moselle department

References

External links
 

Communes of Moselle (department)
Populated places established in 2016
2016 establishments in France